Alexandra "Alex" Lovell (born 28 March 1973) is an English television presenter and voice-over artist. She  has presented the BBC's regional news programme BBC Points West since July 2005.

Early life
Lovell was born in Gravesend, Kent, grew up in Harrogate, North Yorkshire and attended Rose Bruford College, a drama school in London.

Career

Live productions
Lovell began her career as a stage actress, in roles which included Linda in Blood Brothers at the Birmingham Repertory Theatre. In 1997, she joined the Playdays live tour where she puppeteered and voiced Why Bird.

Lovell has also appeared in Pantomime on several occasions including in Cinderella at The New Theatre, Woking in 2002–2003.

Children's television
Lovell's first television role was as a presenter on the Fun Song Factory television series in 1998. She was later appointed as the female presenter for Disney Channel's Playhouse Disney strand with fellow-Fun Song Factory presenter Dave Benson Phillips which began in September 1999, and latterly, on the Playhouse Disney Channel. She and Dave were made redundant from the network in August 2006.

She also had roles in several other children's shows, portraying Miss Thing in the CITV series Timmy Towers and appeared in one episode of the BBC One sitcom My Dad's the Prime Minister, as 'Saskia', a disc jockey.

2000-2007
Lovell's first television acting role outside children's television was as a presenter for Bid-up.tv within the channel's launch in October 2000. The following year, she was poached by rival shopping channel Auction World.tv and began presenting during the launch window as well. She later began presenting on Auction World's sister network Chase-it.tv until the channel's parent company went insolvent in November 2004 following a £450,000 fine by Ofcom.

For a time in 2002, Lovell presented the "iPlay" and "Game Central" strands on Challenge? until they were both dropped at the end of the year.

In August 2002, Lovell's next move was presenting BrainTeaser on Five. Initially, she shared the presentation with a selection of other presenters, but from 2006 until the last show on 7 March 2007, she was the sole presenter except for occasional breaks. She was the only presenter on the show who lasted the entirety of the show's run-up to its axing in March 2007 after the 2007 British premium-rate phone-in scandal.

Lovell moved into regional news by joining the BBC Points West team in July 2005, becoming its lead female anchor, a role she retains to this day. Until 2020, she normally co-presented with fellow-presenter David Garmston until COVID-19 related cuts removed co-presenting roles, with Lovell now presenting alone.

With BrainTeaser being produced in Endemol's Bristol studios, Lovell also did a voice-over role for Channel 4's Deal or No Deal, which she continued until the viewers' competition was dropped in October 2007. She also did a narration role for Fool Around With.

2007-present
After the cancellation of BrainTeaser, Lovell has mostly remained a local presenter, but she has still appeared on national television on occasions.

She appeared in one episode of ITV's The Bill, broadcast on 14 November 2007, playing a television news reporter, Lisa Spence.

In May 2008, she had a role in an episode of BBC1 sitcom Love Soup, playing an entertainment reporter at a red carpet event.

On 6 August 2011, Lovell starred in an episode of Bristol-made BBC programme Casualty as an on-scene television news reporter.

On 9 April 2019, she appeared on an episode of Lorraine to discuss her experience as a stalking victim.

Filmography

Television

Personal life
It was announced on Points West on 4 April 2007 that Lovell had become engaged to Gavin Shorter, technical supervisor at Endemol West Bristol where they both work. The couple married on 14 June 2008.

Lovell is a supporter of deafblind charity Sense. She has visited the Woodside Sense Centre in Bristol and attended the fundraising ball at Tortworth Court in aid of Woodside.

Stalking 
In January 2019, 69-year-old Gordon Hawthorn, a viewer of Points West, was jailed for his six-year stalking campaign against Lovell, following a police appeal. Lovell had suffered panic attacks as a result of receiving 'crude and very graphic' greetings cards at her workplace, sent by Hawthorn, beginning in 2013.

References

External links

Bio at BBC Points West
Bio at John Miles Organisation

Living people
People from Gravesend, Kent
Alumni of Rose Bruford College
English television presenters
BBC newsreaders and journalists
1973 births